1,3,5-Trioxane, sometimes also called trioxane or trioxin, is a chemical compound with molecular formula CHO. It is a white, highly water-soluble solid with a chloroform-like odor. It is a stable cyclic trimer of formaldehyde, and one of the three trioxane isomers; its molecular backbone consists of a six-membered ring with three carbon atoms alternating with three oxygen atoms.

Production
Trioxane can be obtained by the acid-catalyzed cyclic trimerization of formaldehyde in concentrated aqueous solution.

Uses 
Trioxane is often used interchangeably with formaldehyde and with paraformaldehyde. It is a precursor for the production of polyoxymethylene plastics, of which about one million tons per year are produced.  Other applications exploit its tendency to release formaldehyde.  As such it is used as a binder in textiles, wood products, etc.  Trioxane is combined with hexamine and compressed into solid bars to make hexamine fuel tablets, used by the military and outdoorsmen as a cooking fuel.

In the laboratory, trioxane is used as an anhydrous source of formaldehyde.

See also 

 Formaldehyde
 Paraformaldehyde
 Dioxane
 1,3,5-Trioxanetrione

References 

Acetals
Trioxanes